The Wheel of Mainz or Mainzer Rad, in German, was the coat of arms of the Archbishopric of Mainz and thus also of the Electorate of Mainz (Kurmainz), in Rhineland-Palatinate, Germany. It consists of a silver wheel with six spokes on a red background. The wheel can also be found in stonemasons' carvings (e.g. landmarks) and similar objects. Currently, the City of Mainz uses a double wheel connected by a silver cross.

Origin 

The origins of the wheel are not known. One theory traces it back to Bishop Willigis, who was elected Archbishop of Mainz in 975. According to a tale delivered by the Brothers Grimm, his ancestors had been wheelwrights and his adversaries sneered at him for his mean birth. They drew wheels on the walls and doors of his residence, Willigis though made it his personal ensign with the motto "Willigis, remember where you came from". However, this is not proven, and in any case coats of arms only appeared in the 12th century. Most of the archbishops of Mainz used the wheel for the first and third field of their personal coat of arms, using their family's coat of arms for the second and fourth fields.

It is more likely that the wheel refers to Saint Martin, the patron of both the city itself and of Mainz Cathedral. Insignia dating from 1300 depict the saint with both wheels. Moreover, the Archbishops of Mainz were sometimes referred to as the currum dei aurigantes ("Drivers of God's Chariot") and the currum ecclesiae Moguntinae aurigantes ("Charioteers of the Church of Mainz"), to which the wheels may well also be a reference.

Other theories see the wheel as either:
 a symbol of Christ, i.e., XP (Chi, Ro), enclosed in a nimbus;
 the insignia of Emperor Constantine;
 the sign of Mogons, a Celtic sun-god; or
 the sign of Mithras, a Roman god.

Dissemination 

Due to the power wielded by the Elector until 1803, the Wheel of Mainz was recognized across a vast territory, and it can be seen in many coats of arms of towns belonging to the collegiate church, such as Erfurt, which belonged to the archbishopric for centuries. In addition, it is seen in the following coats of arms: Mainz-Hechtsheim, Mainz-Laubenheim, Mainz-Lerchenberg, Mainz-Weisenau, as well as Alzenau, Arenshausen, Bad Hersfeld, Bad Sobernheim, Berlingerode, Biebergemünd, Birkungen in Leinefelde-Worbis, Blankenbach, Bönnigheim, Brehme, Breitenworbis, Bürgstadt, Büttstedt, Cleebronn, Collenberg, Deuna, Dorfprozelten, Dünwald, Effelder, Eichenbühl, Eichsfeld, Elsenfeld, Eltville (ehemalige Residenz), Ortsteil Ershausen der Gemeinde Schimberg, Faulbach, Frammersbach, Frankfurt-Griesheim, Frankfurt-Höchst, Frankfurt-Nied, Freienhagen, Fritzlar, site of an important cathedral chapter, Gau-Algesheim, Geisenheim, Samtgemeinde Gieboldehausen, Gieboldehausen, Goldbach, Großbartloff, Großheubach, Großvargula, Gumbsheim, Haibach (Unterfranken), Hanau-Steinheim, Hausen (bei Aschaffenburg), Heilbad Heiligenstadt, Heppenheim (Bergstraße), Hergenfeld, Heyerode, Hofgeismar, Hofheim am Taunus, Holungen (Landkreis Eichsfeld), Hundeshagen, Johannesberg, Jützenbach, Kahl am Main, Kelkheim (Taunus), Kelkheim-Münster, Kella, Kirchgandern, Kirchheim, Thuringia, Kirchzell (Landkreis Miltenberg), Kleinostheim, Kleinwallstadt, Klingenberg am Main, Krautheim (Landkreis Hohenlohe), Kreuzebra, Langenthal (Hunsrück), Leidersbach, Verwaltungsgemeinschaft Lindenberg/Eichsfeld, Lorch (Rheingau), Mainaschaff, Marth, Miltenberg, Mömbris, Mönchberg, Monzingen, Mühlberg, Thuringia, Naumburg/Hessen, Neudenau (with eight spokes), the former Gemeinde Herbolzheim, since 1973 Herbolzheim, part of the city of Neudenau, Neunkirchen (Unterfranken), Neustadt (Eichsfeld), Niedernberg (Landkreis Miltenberg), Niederwalluf, Nöda, Obergriesheim, Oberlahnstein, Ober-Mörlen, Oberursel (Taunus), Pleitersheim, Rauenthal, Ravenstein, Reinholterode, Rieneck, Rodgau, Rohrberg, Röllbach, Rothenbuch, Sailauf, Schloßböckelheim, Schöllkrippen, Schöneberg (Hunsrück), Seesbach, Seligenstadt, Sömmerda, Sulzbach am Main (Landkreis Miltenberg), Treffurt, Uder, Viernheim, Waldaschaff, Walldürn, Weibersbrunn, Weilbach (Bayern), Weißenborn-Lüderode, Wiesen, Wittighausen, Worbis in Leinefelde-Worbis, and Wüstheuterode.

It also occurs in the coats of arms of the following Kreise (districts)
Hohenlohekreis
Landkreis Aschaffenburg
the former Landkreis Buchen (merged with Neckar-Odenwald-Kreis in 1973)
Landkreis Darmstadt-Dieburg
Landkreis Eichsfeld
Landkreis Göttingen
the former Landkreis Künzelsau (merged with Hohenlohekreis in 1973)
Landkreis Lohr
Landkreis Main-Spessart
Landkreis Mainz-Bingen
Landkreis Miltenberg
the former Landkreis Mosbach (merged with Neckar-Odenwald-Kreis in 1973)
Landkreis Offenbach
Landkreis Sömmerda
the former Landkreis Tauberbischofsheim (merged with Main-Tauber-Kreis in 1973)
Landkreis Weimarer Land
Main-Tauber-Kreis
Main-Taunus-Kreis
Neckar-Odenwald-Kreis
Rheingau-Taunus-Kreis
Unstrut-Hainich-Kreis

It also features in the arms of Rhineland-Palatinate itself.

Coats of Arms featuring the Wheel of Mainz

Rhineland-Palatinate

Hesse

Baden-Württemberg

Bavaria

Thuringia

Lower Saxony

Bishops

German municipal arms with wheels which have no connection to Mainz 
 Donnersbergkreis: The two wheels come from the earlier arms of Kirchheimbolanden and Rockenhausen. The red wheel represented the line of Bolanden, the blue represented the line of Hohenfels.
 Osnabrück: this city's arms have a black, or sometimes red, wheel of six spokes on a silver field. The flag is white with black border stripes. A wheel is known as a device on coins of the Archdiocese of Osnabrück and appears in seals of as early as the 13th century, although during the course of time it was altered many times, the originally red wheel having become black by 1496. Later the red colour was re-adopted, but the black tincture has won out. In the 13th century Saint Peter was portrayed next to the wheel, as patron of the cathedral.
 The coat of arms of  includes two red five-spoked cartwheels and two red five-petalled roses in the quarters of the black cross of the Archbishops and Electors of Cologne (Kurköln). The rose represents the noble family which had its ancestral home in Störmede since 1233 (compare the coat of arms of the von Lippe family). After Albert von Störmede bequeathed his fief to his son-in-law Friedrich von Hörde, the cartwheel of the von Hördes was added to the roses.
Geseke: the current coat of arms was adopted on 17 August 1977, replacing the silver cross which had been adopted on 16 November 1902. The silver cross had appeared on seals as early as the late Middle Ages, the earliest example dating from 1237. It is related to the arms of the Archbishopric of Cologne, a black cross on silver. The cross was first used as a coat of arms officially around 1700. The wheel of Störmede was added to the coat of arms after a reform of districts united Störmede with Geseke.

References

External links 

 Entwicklung des Erfurter Wappens, Abschnitt über das Mainzer Rad (Arms of Erfurt, with a section on the Wheel of Mainz) 
 Die Gebrüder Grimm: Das Rad im Mainzer Wappen (The Brothers Grimm: the wheel in the arms of Mainz) 
 The various explanations concerning the origins of the Wheel of Mainz are available as a PDF from the Rhineland-Palatinate Landeszentrale für politische Bildung at here 
 Mainz aus heraldischer Sicht - Wappen in Mainz (by Dr. B. Peter) (Mainz seen heraldically: arms in Mainz) 

Mainz
Heraldic charges
History of Mainz
Coats of arms with wheels